Ricky Lee Cox (born 1958) is an American politician. He served as a Republican member for the 51st district of the Kentucky House of Representatives.

In 1997, Cox was elected for the 51st district of the Kentucky House of Representatives, succeeding Ray H. Altman, and serving until 2000.

References 

1958 births
Living people
Place of birth missing (living people)
Republican Party members of the Kentucky House of Representatives
20th-century American politicians
21st-century American politicians